Abell 3411 is a galaxy cluster in the constellation Hydra. It is located about two billion light-years from Earth and weighs about a million billion times the mass of the Sun.

See also
 Abell catalogue

References

Galaxy clusters
Hydra (constellation)